The Scottish Political Archive (SPA) is located within the University of Stirling and was founded in 2010. The archive is made up of several collections that focus on the political history of Scotland in the 20th and 21st centuries.

History 
The archive was founded in 2010 and has gained a number of collections from Scottish political figures over the years. The purpose of the archive is to preserve political memorabilia, which includes posters, newsletters and leaflets. An important part of the archive is the material it has collected concerning the 1979 and 1997 devolution referendums, and the 2014 Independence Referendum.

The archive has recently gained the Canon Kenyon Wright Collection which they are currently cataloguing.

Collections 

 The Scots Independent newspaper photograph Collection
 The George Robertson Collection
 The Bruce Watson Collection
 The Devolution Referendums Oral History Collection
 The SPA Photographic Collection
 The Dennis Canavan Collection
 Federation of Student Nationalists Collection
 The Jack McConnell Collection
 The Bus Party Collection
 Canon Kenyon Wright Collection

References

External links 
 The Flickr Account for the Scottish Political Archive
 Bus Party Article

University of Stirling
Archives in Scotland